The 2015–16 season was the club's third season in the Scottish Premiership and their seventh consecutive season in the top flight of Scottish football. St Johnstone also competed in the Europa League, League Cup and the Scottish Cup.

Results

Pre season friendlies

Scottish Premiership

UEFA Europa League

Qualifying phase

League Cup

Scottish Cup

Squad statistics
During the 2015–16 season, St Johnstone have used twenty-four different players in competitive games. The table below shows the number of appearances and goals scored by each player.

Appearances

|}

Disciplinary record

Goal scorers

Team statistics

League table

Division summary

Management statistics
Last updated on 6 February 2016

Transfers

In

Out

See also
 List of St Johnstone F.C. seasons

Notes

References

St Johnstone
St Johnstone F.C. seasons